The Rue de Vaugirard (Street of Vaugirard) is the longest street inside Paris's former city walls, at . It spans the 6th and 15th arrondissements. The Senate, housed in the Palais du Luxembourg, is at 15 Rue de Vaugirard.

Location
The Rue de Vaugirard is mostly a one-way street from the southwest edge of Paris (at the Porte de Versailles) towards the Latin Quarter at the junction of Boulevard Victor and Boulevard Lefebvre. Traffic flows in both directions between the Rue de Rennes and the Place de l'Odéon. Numbering starts in the Latin Quarter, reaching the 400s by Porte de Versailles. It the longest street in Paris.

History
The road, which appeared in the 15th century, led from Philip II's city walls towards the village of Vaugirard. This route was itself based on an old Roman road.

Origin of the name
"Vaugirard" came from an old French noun-and-genitive construction "val Girard" = "vale of Girard" (Latin vallis Girardi), after an Abbé Girard, who owned the land over which the road passes.

Sites of interest
A substantial chunk of Line 12 of the Paris Métro follows the Rue de Vaugirard. The following stations have entrances on the road:
Porte de Versailles
Convention
Vaugirard
Volontaires
Pasteur
Falguière
Saint-Placide (Line 4)

Gallery

See also
 6th arrondissement of Paris
 15th arrondissement of Paris

Latin Quarter, Paris
Streets in the 6th arrondissement of Paris
Streets in the 15th arrondissement of Paris